Gene "Stick Elliott" Daves (July 27, 1934 – November 1, 1980) was an American professional stock car racing driver. He was a driver in the NASCAR Winston Cup Series from 1962 to 1971. He was a 2009 inductee in the National Dirt Late Model Hall of Fame.

References

1934 births
1980 deaths
American racing drivers
NASCAR drivers

People from Shelby, North Carolina
People from Cleveland County, North Carolina